Ira Berkow (born January 7, 1940, in Chicago, Illinois) is an American sports reporter, columnist, and writer. He shared the 2001 Pulitzer Prize for National Reporting, which was awarded to the staff of The New York Times for their series How Race Is Lived in America.

Life

Berkow earned his BA in English Literature at Miami University, and his MA from the Medill School of Journalism, Northwestern University.

He was a reporter for the Minneapolis Tribune, a syndicated features writer, sports and general columnist, and sports editor for the Newspaper Enterprise Association.

From 1981 to 2007 he was a sports reporter and columnist for The New York Times and has written for Esquire, The New York Times Magazine, Art News, Seventeen, Chicago Magazine, The Chicago Tribune Magazine, National Strategic Forum Review, Reader's Digest, and Sports Illustrated, among others.

He shared the 2001 Pulitzer Prize for National Reporting for his article "The Minority Quarterback" in The New York Times series How Race Is Lived in America.  His work has been reprinted or cited over six decades in the annual anthologies Best Sports Stories and its successor Best American Sports Writing, and a column of his was included in Best American Sports Writing of the Century (1999). The novelist Scott Turow wrote, "Ira Berkow is one of the great American writers, without limitation to the field of sports."

He was also a finalist for the Pulitzer Prize in 1988, "For thoughtful commentary on the sports scene."

In 2006, he was inducted into the International Jewish Sports Hall of Fame. He holds an honorary doctorate degree from Roosevelt University (Chicago), 2009.

Berkow is the author of 26 books including the Edgar Allan Poe Award nominated non-fiction The Man Who Robbed The Pierre: The Story of Bobby Comfort and the Biggest Hotel Robbery Ever.

Works

Books
It Happens Every Spring: DiMaggio, Mays, the Splendid Splinter, and a Lifetime at the Ballpark, Triumph Books, 2017, 
Giants Among Men: Y.A., L.T., the Big Tuna, and Other New York Giants Stories, Triumph Books, 2015, 
Counterpunch: Ali, Tyson, the Brown Bomber, and Other Stories of the Boxing Ring, Triumph Books, 2014, 
Autumns in the Garden: The Coach of Camelot and Other Knicks Stories, Triumph Books, 2013, 
Summers at Shea: Tom Seaver Loses His Overcoat and Other Mets Stories, Triumph Books, 2013, 
Summers in the Bronx: Attila the Hun and Other Yankee Stories, Triumph Books, 2009, 
The Corporal Was a Pitcher: The Courage of Lou Brissie, Triumph Books, 2009, 
Hank Greenberg: The Story of My Life, Times Books, 1989, editor 
Red: A Biography of Red Smith, Rockin Steady, University of Nebraska Press, 2007, 
Court Vision, To The Hoop: The Seasons of a Basketball Life, University of Nebraska Press, 2004, 
The Gospel According to Casey, (with Jim Kaplan), St. Martin's Press, 1992, 
The Minority Quarterback & Other Lives In Sports, I.R. Dee, 2002, 
Full Swing; Hits, Runs and Errors in a Writer’s Life, Ivan R. Dee Publisher, 2007, 
Maxwell Street, Survival in a Bazaar. Doubleday & Co., 1977, .
To the Hoop The Seasons of a Basketball Life, Basic Books, 1997.
How to Talk Jewish, by Jackie Mason (with Ira Berkow), St. Martin's Press, 1990
Hank Greenberg: Hall-of-Fame Slugger, juvenile, The Jewish Publication Society, 1991 
Pitchers do Get Lonely, and Other Sports Stories, Atheneum, 1988
Carew, by Rod Carew (with Ira Berkow), Simon and Schuster, 1979.
The DuSable Panthers: The Greatest, Blackest, Saddest Team from the Meanest Street in Chicago, 1978
Beyond the Dream: Occasional Heroes of Sports, (foreword by Red Smith), Atheneum,1975
Oscar Robertson: The Golden Year 1964, Prentice-Hall, 1971
Rockin' Steady: A Guide to Basketball and Cool, by Walt "Clyde" Frazier (with Ira Berkow), 1974
Wrigley Feld: An Oral and Narrative History of the Home of the Chicago Cubs (with Josh Noel), Stewart, Tabori and Chang, 2014.
Full Swing: Hits, Runs and Errors in a Writer's Life, Ivan R. Dee,2006.

Film
Jews and Baseball: An American Love Story, 2010 documentary film; writer
Champions of American Sport, HBO documentary, 1983; film writer

References

Further reading
 This chapter in Ruttman's history, based on a June 28, 2008 interview with Berkow conducted for the book, discusses Berkow's American, Jewish, baseball, and life experiences from youth to the present.

External links
"Ira Berkow", Charlie Rose
Ira Berkow Papers at the American Jewish Historical Society, New York, NY and Boston, MA

1940 births
Sportswriters from New York (state)
Miami University alumni
Medill School of Journalism alumni
Living people
Jewish American writers
Writers from Chicago
Sportswriters from Illinois
Pulitzer Prize for National Reporting winners
21st-century American Jews